Sein Beda (also spelt Sein Baydar; 10 November 1882 – 8 October 1942) was a prominent Burmese classical musician based in Mandalay, Burma (now Myanmar).

Career 
Sein Beda was known for his expertise in the hsaing waing, the Burmese musical ensemble, ranging from traditional instruments such as the saung, mi gyaung, and pattala, to Western instruments like the violin, banjo, mandolin, concertina, and cornet.

Sein Beda began performing at the age of 16. He was a favorite musician of Thibaw Min, the Konbaung dynasty's last reigning monarch, and was conferred the title of Nemyo Bala Kyaw Thu (နေမျိုးဗလကျော်သူ) and an appanage of a large village by Thibaw Min for his musical talents. He became the first Burmese hsaing musician to perform in British India, after being invited to the housewarming of Thibaw Min's residence in Ratnagiri.

During the British colonial period, Sein Beda introduced various innovations to the ensemble, including decorating ensemble stands with traditional Burmese motifs and glass mosaic, introducing a jazz band to the ensemble, creating spotlights, and introducing musician uniforms.

Beda died of a throat problem (possibly cancer) on 8 October 1942 in Rangoon.

Legacy 
Among Sein Beda's children was Sein Hla Maung, an orchestra musician. His granddaughter Shwe Aye Aye Myint was a prominent classical dancer from the 1980s to the 1990s.

Notes

References

Biography
 

1882 births
1942 deaths
People from Mandalay
Burmese musicians
Musicians in British Burma